Mother's Brewing Company is an independent microbrewery in the heart of downtown Springfield, Missouri, USA, brewing beer since 2011. The beers are currently distributed in the majority of Missouri, Arkansas, and the most eastern portion of Kansas.

History
Mother's Brewing Company was founded by Jeff Schrag, a Springfield entrepreneur and publisher.  The brewery was built in the former home of a Butternut bread bakery owned by Hostess Brands.  The bakery was closed in 2009 when the company faced financial difficulties.  Schrag purchased the building in 2010.  Demolition and renovations were completed by May 2011.  The company celebrated with a concert and festival that had over 2,700 in attendance.

The brewery building currently houses all operations for Mother's.  The brewhouse is capable of producing 30 US barrels, or 60 kegs, of beer in a single batch.

The brewery building also includes a bar and events space called the Tasting Room.  The Tasting Room is open to the public during limited hours and offers free samples of all the beers on tap.  The Tasting Room also sells pints, Growlers, and Mother's merchandise.  The room will also offer tours of the brewery on Saturdays.  Tours are scheduled to start in July 2011, and will focus on the sensory experiences of brewing beer.

On May 30, 2012, National Brewer's Association said Mother's was one of 250 craft breweries that opened in 2011, but of them all, Mother's was number one. The association went on to say Mother's had the best launch of any new brewery opening in the past five years.

Specialty Beers

References

External links
 Mother's Brewing Company

Beer brewing companies based in Missouri